William Whittlesey was a 14th-century archbishop of Canterbury.

William Whittlesey may also refer to:

William A. Whittlesey (1796–1866), U.S. Representative from Ohio